Odense Teater is a theater in the city of Odense in Denmark. It dates back to 1796, which makes it Denmark's second oldest theater. It is one of the country's three main theaters.

The venue is located in Jernbanegade, where it has three stages: Store Scene, Værkstedet, and Foyerscenen. It also has stages at Farinen and Raffinaderiet in the old sugar factory of Odense, where there is also a drama school.

History 
Odense Teater used to be at Sortebrødre Torv, where Hans Christian Andersen started as a writer.

It is notable in theatrical history for staging the première of Henrik Ibsen's first contemporary realist drama The Pillars of Society on 14 November 1877.

Since 1914, the theater has been in Jernbanegade along with the King's Gardens and the Funen's Art Museum.

External links 
 Odense Teater

References 

Odense
Theatres in Denmark
1796 establishments in Denmark
Buildings and structures in Odense
Tourist attractions in Odense